The Melaka International School (MIS) is an international school in Malacca, Malaysia serving both the local and expatriate population. The school was founded in 1993 and was licensed by the Ministry of Education of Malaysia (MOE).

Melaka International School provides British Curriculum Education and is open from Junior Pre School (kindergarten) to A-Levels (pre-university). Students are prepared for the University of Cambridge IGCSE 'O' and 'A' level examination.

They have international students for both primary and secondary levels from 17 countries namely Korea, India, Japan, Iraq, United Kingdom, United States, Australia, Philippines, Singapore, Taiwan, Pakistan, Germany, Sri Lanka, Algeria, Canada and Malaysia. Their academic staff members are drawn from the international arena as well. They are recruited from all over the world.

External links

 Melaka International School Website

British international schools in Malaysia
Schools in Malacca
Cambridge schools in Malaysia